Cadmium tungstate (CdWO4 or CWO), the cadmium salt of tungstic acid, is a dense, chemically inert solid which is used as a scintillation crystal to detect gamma rays. It has density of 7.9 g/cm3 and melting point of 1325 °C. It is toxic if inhaled or swallowed. Its crystals are transparent, colorless, with slight yellow tint. It is odorless. It is not hygroscopic.

The crystal is transparent and emits light when it is hit by gamma rays and x-rays, making it useful as a detector of ionizing radiation. Its peak scintillation wavelength is 480 nm (with emission range between 380-660 nm), and efficiency of 13000 photons/MeV. It has a relatively high light yield, its light output is about 40% of NaI(Tl), but the time of scintillation is quite long (12−15 μs). It is often used in computed tomography. Combining the scintillator crystal with externally applied piece of boron carbide allows construction of compact detectors of gamma rays and neutron radiation.

Cadmium tungstate was used as a replacement of calcium tungstate in some fluoroscopes since the 1940s. Very high radiopurity allows use of this scintillator as a detector of rare nuclear processes (double beta decay, other rare alpha and beta decays) in low-background applications. For example, the first indication of the natural alpha activity of tungsten (alpha decay of 180W) had been found in 2003 with CWO detectors. Due to different time of light emission for different types of ionizing particles, the alpha-beta discrimination technique has been developed for CWO scintillators.

Cadmium tungstate films can be deposited by sol-gel technology. Cadmium tungstate nanorods can be synthesized by a hydrothermal process.

Similar materials are calcium tungstate (scheelite) and zinc tungstate.

It is toxic, as are all cadmium compounds.

References

External links
Scintillator materials

Cadmium compounds
Tungstates
Phosphors and scintillators